Gustavo Costa da Silva Machado (born 8 June 1996), known as Gustavo Bochecha or just Bochecha, is a Brazilian footballer who plays as a midfielder for Portuguesa, on loan from Coritiba.

Career statistics

Club

Notes

References

External links

1996 births
Living people
Brazilian footballers
Association football midfielders
Campeonato Brasileiro Série A players
Campeonato Brasileiro Série B players
Duque de Caxias Futebol Clube players
Botafogo de Futebol e Regatas players
Esporte Clube Juventude players
Coritiba Foot Ball Club players
Grêmio Novorizontino players
Associação Portuguesa de Desportos players
People from Maricá